Mananpur is a village situated in Okari Block in Jehanabad District of Bihar State in India. It is located 6.5 km from Bandhuganj and at 4 km from Telhara. The Total population of this village is around 1500.

History 
The people of Pariyanva village established a new village as people have maximum land that was far from their residence, so they founded the Village, Mananpur.

Agriculture 
The mostly farmers are doing the agriculture of rice and wheat. Crop like maize and Grams also grown in this Village.

Educations 
Mananpur village has higher literacy rate compared to Bihar. In 2011, literacy rate of Mananpur village was 87% compared to 61.80% of Bihar. In Mananpur Male literacy stands at 95% while female literacy rate was 79%

Working conditions 
Average people of the village are working as farmer, however, few educated villagers are employed in Jehanabad and Patna or other states.

Schools in the village 
 Holy child public School, Mananpur (NC to 5th standard for Children), (Private School).
 Ms akauna Mananpur (1st to 8th standard), (Government School).

References 

Villages in Jehanabad district